The Western Gulf coastal grasslands are a subtropical grassland ecoregion of the southern United States and northeastern Mexico. It is known in Louisiana as the "Cajun Prairie", Texas as "Coastal Prairie," and as the Tamaulipan pastizal in Mexico.

Setting
Specific areas include a number of barrier islands, and the resacas or natural levees of the Laguna Madre. The coast is vulnerable to tropical storms that can seriously damage habitats.

This ecosystem, in part, has edaphic origins: the soils of this ecoregion are largely dominated by vertisol clays, the mechanical properties of which make it difficult for many tree species to grow and establish. As a result, extensive forest cover is precluded, allowing grasses and other herbaceous species to dominate. However, there are interspersed areas of higher sand and silt content that break up the otherwise heavy clay environment: these areas typically correspond to floodplain/riparian zones, and are more permissive of tree-growth, featuring galleries or even closed-canopy  bottomland expanses.

Climate
From Southwest Louisiana west to the Upper Texas coast, the climate is wet humid subtropical, featuring significal annual precipitation. The climate becomes more arid farther south along the Texas coast into northeastern Mexico, though precipitation totals still remain high enough for the humid subtropical classification.

Flora
The natural habitat of the area is a mix of tallgrass prairie similar to those found in inland Texas, with Indiangrass (Sorghastrum nutans), big bluestem (Andropogon gerardi), little bluestem (Schizachyrium scoparium), and switchgrass (Panicum virgatum) the primary tallgrass species that are typical of the coastal prairie, with several other shorter grasses and many herbaceous and woody species.

Separating the grassier habitats are bottomland forests and woodlands, which are present within the floodplains of the region's many waterways. In the wetter climate covering the zone from Southwest Louisiana west through the upper Texas coast, these bottomlands contain many species typical in forests elsewhere across the Southern United States, such as the southern live oak, bald cypress, magnolia, loblolly pine, post oak, and southern hackberry. Farther south, from the lower one third of the Texas coast and through the Tamaulipan stretch, the drier climate supports shrubby areas of honey mesquite (Prosopis glandulosa), huisache (Vachellia farnesiana var. farnesiana), lime prickly-ash (Zanthoxylum fagara), and Texas persimmon (Diospyros texana).

Fauna
This coast is rich in wildlife, and 700 species of birds, animals and reptiles have been counted here, although many are now threatened or endangered. This coast is a critical habitat for the Attwater's prairie chickens (Tympanuchus cupido attwateri), over one million of which inhabited the prairie in Texas and Louisiana in the 19th century, but extreme reduction of their habitat put them on the U.S. endangered species list in 1967. Another endangered bird of the coast is the whooping crane (Grus americana). Many species of wading birds, shorebirds, and other waterbirds are abundant. Birds in the Mexican part of the region include Morelet’s seedeater (Sporophila morelleti), red-billed pigeon (Columba flavirostris), brown jay (Cyanocorax morio), Neotropic cormorant, white-winged dove (Leptotila verrequxi) and Audubon's oriole (Icterus graduacauda).

Mammals of the area include bobcats, collared peccary, white-tailed deer, eastern cottontails, with ocelot (Leopardus pardalis), Gulf Coast jaguarundi (Puma yagouaroundi cacomitli), southern yellow bat (Lasiurus ega), and Mexican spiny pocket mouse (Liomys irroratus) more abundant in Mexico. Rancho Nuevo beach in Tamaulipas and along the Texas coast are the only nesting sites in the world for the Kemp's ridley sea turtle (Lepidochelys kempii) while other herpetofauna of the southern part of the ecoregion include Río Grande chirping frog (Eleutherodactylus cystignathoides) and Mexican white-lipped frog (Leptodactylus fragilis).

Threats and preservation
Less than 1% of the ecoregion remains in pristine condition, almost entirely in Texas, while most of the coast has been converted to farmland, including rice paddies, grazing land, or urban areas including Houston, Texas. Estuaries and other coastal wetlands are better preserved than the prairie and indeed the protected areas of the coast are mainly sanctuaries for waterbirds.

Gallery

See also
List of ecoregions in Mexico
List of ecoregions in the United States (WWF)

References

Gulf Coast of Mexico
Gulf Coast of the United States
Tropical and subtropical grasslands, savannas, and shrublands
Ecoregions of Mexico
Tropical and subtropical grasslands, savannas, and shrublands of the United States
Ecoregions of the United States
Grasslands of Mexico
Grasslands of the United States
Grasslands of Texas
 
 
 
Natural history of Louisiana
Natural history of Tamaulipas
Natural history of Texas
Nearctic ecoregions